Highwood is a hamlet in the New Forest National Park of Hampshire, England. According to the Post Office the population of the hamlet at the 2011 Census was included in the civil parish of Ellingham, Harbridge and Ibsley.   Its nearest town is Ringwood, which lies approximately 1.5 miles (2.2 km) south-west from the village.

Hamlets in Hampshire